The Manitoba Advocate for Children and Youth (MACY)—formerly the Office of the Children's Advocate of Manitoba—is an independent office of the Legislative Assembly of Manitoba whose stated purpose is to "represent the rights, interests and viewpoints of children, youth, and young adults throughout Manitoba who are receiving, or should be receiving" relevant services. Such services include child and family, adoption, mental health, addiction, education, disability, justice, and victim support.

Its mandate is defined by The Advocate for Children and Youth Act and Regulation, and its functions are effectively comparable to those of a Children's ombudsman.

Sherry Gott has been the Manitoba Advocate since October 2022.

References

External links
 

Advocate_for_Children_and_Youth
Manitoba
Youth in Canada